Sebastijan Glavinić (1632–5 July 1697) was a Habsburg Croatian Roman Catholic bishop. Glavinić was born at Pićan, Istria, before 18 January 1632, a son of Nikola Glavinić. The Glavinić family fled from Glamoč (in Bosnia) to Istria due to the Ottoman invasion. He was baptized on 18 January 1632. Glavinić studied theology and philosophy in Graz, Wien and Trnava. He was ordained priest on 26 March 1660.

Notes

People from Istria
1632 births
1697 deaths
17th-century Roman Catholic bishops in Croatia
Habsburg Croats